Tanner Wolfe (born September 17, 1985 in Dunedin, Florida) is an American soccer player.

Career

College and Amateur
Wolfe played his collegiate career at Stetson University from 2004 to 2008, appearing in 75 out of 75 games and posted 33 career goals, 18 assists, and 84 total points.

During his college career, Wolfe played with USL Premier Development League club Central Florida Kraze during their 2007, 2008, and 2009 seasons and with the Bradenton Academics during the 2010 season.

Professional
Wolfe signed his first professional contract in March 2011, joining USL Pro club Wilmington Hammerheads. He made his professional debut on May 21, 2011, coming on as a second-half substitute in a 3-0 win over Charleston Battery.

References

External links
 Stetson profile

1985 births
Living people
People from Dunedin, Florida
Soccer players from Florida
American soccer players
Orlando City U-23 players
IMG Academy Bradenton players
North Carolina Fusion U23 players
Wilmington Hammerheads FC players
USL League Two players
National Premier Soccer League players
USL Championship players
Stetson Hatters men's soccer players
Tampa Marauders players
St. Petersburg Kickers players
Association football midfielders
Association football forwards
Sportspeople from Pinellas County, Florida